You're So Fine may refer to:

Music

Albums
You're So Fine, Ike & Tina Turner 1993

Songs
 "You're So Fine" (Little Walter song), 1953
 "You're So Fine" (The Falcons song), Lance Finney, Willie Schofield, Bob West, 1959
 "You're So Fine" (CNBLUE song), 2016
 "You're So Fine", by Rick Nelson composed by Dorsey Burnette
 "You're So Fine", by Tina Turner
 "You're So Fine", by Rose Royce composed by T. Santiel, A. Santiel